Palliohedyle is a genus of gastropods belonging to the family Acochlidiidae.

Species:

Palliohedyle sutteri 
Palliohedyle weberi

References

Gastropods